Jefferson R. Boulware (July 27, 1867 – April 8, 1913) was an American lawyer and politician.

Born in Putnam County, Illinois, Boulware moved with his family to Clark County, Missouri. He went to the Clark County public schools and then graduated from LaGrange College in Missouri (now Hannibal–LaGrange University). He went to a law school in St. Louis, Missouri, and was admitted to the Missouri bar. Boulware taught school in Petersburg, Illinois. In 1896, Boulware moved to Peoria, Illinois, and continued to practice law. Boulware served in the Illinois House of Representatives from 1901 to 1905 and was a Democrat. Boulware died in a hospital in  Springfield, Illinois, after suffering from a stroke while at a meeting of the Illinois Bar Association.

Notes

External links

1867 births
1913 deaths
Politicians from Peoria, Illinois
People from Putnam County, Illinois
People from Clark County, Missouri
Hannibal–LaGrange University alumni
Educators from Illinois
Illinois lawyers
Missouri lawyers
Democratic Party members of the Illinois House of Representatives
Educators from Missouri